Roseway is a wooden gaff-rigged schooner launched on 24 November 1925 in Essex, Massachusetts.  She is currently operated by World Ocean School, a non-profit educational organization based in Boston, Massachusetts, and is normally operated out of Boston, Massachusetts and Saint Croix, U.S. Virgin Islands.  She was designated a National Historic Landmark in 1997 as the only known surviving example of a fishing schooner built specifically with racing competition as an objective. In 1941, Roseway was purchased by the Boston Pilot's Association to serve as a pilot boat for Boston Harbor, as a replacement for the pilot-boat Northern Light, which was sold to the United States Army for war service.

History 

Roseway was built in 1925 for Harold Hathaway of Taunton, Massachusetts at the John F. James & Son shipyard in Essex. Hathaway's intention was to build a boat that might beat the Canadians in the international fisherman's races popular at that time; to that end, Roseway was impeccably maintained and used only occasionally as a fishing boat.

Roseway sank at Wolfville, Nova Scotia, Canada, on 14 September 1926, but she was raised and repaired.

In 1941, Roseway was purchased by the Boston Pilot's Association to serve as a pilot boat for Boston Harbor, as a replacement for the pilot-boat Northern Light, No. 3, which was sold to the United States Army for war service. Following the attack on Pearl Harbor later that year, mines and anti-submarine netting were installed to protect the Port of Boston, and all lighted navigational aids were extinguished. Roseway was fitted with a .50 caliber machine gun for service with the Coast Guard Reserve as patrol vessel as CGR-812. She continued her piloting duties in this challenging environment, for which service her pilots were awarded a bronze plaque from the Coast Guard at the end of the war.

Roseway continued to serve as a pilot vessel until the early 1970s, at which point she and San Francisco's Zodiac were the only pilot schooners still in service in the United States. She was then sold and converted into a passenger vessel for the tourist trade. Roseway changed hands several times in the ensuing decades, operating primarily out of Camden, Maine and the US Virgin Islands.  In 1997, she was listed as a National Historic Landmark. Roseway, at that time, retained between eighty and ninety percent of her original hull fabric and was badly in need of repairs. She remained docked in Rockland, Maine until she was repossessed by the First National Bank of Damariscotta, which in 2002 donated the vessel to the newly founded World Ocean School.

Following two years of restoration in Boothbay Harbor, Roseway again set sail in 2005. She currently serves as the platform for the World Ocean School, which offers various educational programs in St. Croix and the northeastern United States.

See also
List of National Historic Landmarks in Boston
National Register of Historic Places listings in northern Boston, Massachusetts
History of Full Rigged Ships
List of schooners

References

External links
World Ocean School
National Historic Landmark listing for the schooner Roseway
Boston Pilots' Association

Individual sailing vessels
National Historic Landmarks in Boston
Schooners of the United States
Ships built in Essex, Massachusetts
Two-masted ships
Ships on the National Register of Historic Places in Massachusetts
1925 ships
Maritime incidents in 1926
National Register of Historic Places in Boston
Sail training ships